The Armenian Social-Democratic Labour Organization (Sotsial-Demokratakan Banvorakan Hai Kazmakerpoutiun, abbreviated «ՍԴԲՀԿ», S.D.B.H.K.), often pejoratively referred to as the Specificists (spets’ifikner), was an Armenian Marxist organization in the Russian Empire.

History
The S.D.B.H.K. was founded in Baku in October 1903 by a group of Armenians who had become Marxists during studies in Germany and Switzerland, as well as a few ex-Dashnaks, ex-Hunchak intellectuals and others. The group was, in particular, dissatisfied with the outcome of the 2nd Congress of the Russian Social Democratic Labour Party.

The S.D.B.H.K. sought to establish trade unions among Armenian workers along similar lines as the General Jewish Labour Bund. Like the General Jewish Labour Bund, the S.D.B.H.K. argued with the Bolsheviks and Mensheviks to allow autonomous ethnic organizations within the Russian Social Democratic Labour Party. The organization argued that 'specific' conditions applied in Transcaucasia, especially in Armenian-dominated areas and that these areas needed a special agrarian program. Key ideologues of the S.D.B.H.K. included Bakhshi Ishkhanyan, A. Rubeni (who later joined the Bolsheviks), Ghazar Ter Ghazarian, Nariman Ter Ghazarian, T. Isakhanyan, E. Palyan, G. Kuzikyan (Yesalim), and D. Ter-Danielyan (Davit Ananun).

In its early phase, the small organization began agitations among workers and students, and began publishing leaflets and brochures for mass distribution. The S.D.B.H.K. distributed its propaganda in and around Baku (mobilizing workers in Balakhani, Bibi-Eybat and Black Town) as well as in Batumi, Tiflis, and in the country-side of Karabakh. On May 1, 1904, the S.D.B.H.K. organized a strike of 4,0005,000 Armenian workers in Balakhani.

The Armenian Social-Democratic Workers Organization concentrated its efforts in labour organizing, leading some thirty strikes between 1906 and 1917. It claimed to have some 2,000 workers organized in its unions. The organization had influence among Armenian workers in Baku, Tiflis and Batumi. The S.D.B.H.K. favoured a system of broad local government and national-cultural autonomy within Russia.

In 1904, its main organ was Sotsiyalist ('Socialist') issued from Baku, which later relocated to Geneva and continued publishing there 1905-1906. In January 1905, the S.D.B.H.K. was invited to a conference of the Russian Social Democratic Labour Party, the General Jewish Labour Bund, the Social Democracy in the Latvian Territory and the Revolutionary Ukrainian Party. The S.D.B.H.K. had expressed its intention to send a delegation for the conference, but did not attend in the end.

The S.D.B.H.K. received fierce criticisms from the other social democratic factions in the Caucasus, both the Bolsheviks (Stalin and Stepan Shaumian) and Mensheviks ( and Noe Zhordania). Ahead of the 3rd Congress of the Russian Social Democratic Labour Party in 1905, both the Menshevik leader Zhordania and the Bolshevik leader Lenin argued against a union with S.D.B.H.K. Lenin referred to the group as a 'bundist creature'.

Following the defeat of the Russian Revolution of 1905, the S.D.B.H.K. had local units in Baku, Tiflis, Batumi and Shusha. During 1906-1907 the S.D.B.H.K. published Kiank ('Life') and, later, Dzayn ('Voice') as its Tiflis organs. Later Specifist organs included Banvor ('Worker') published in Baku in 1907 (revived in 1917), Gorts ('Work') in Tiflis in 1908; Nor kiank ('New Life') in Baku 1911-1912, Garun ('Spring') in Moscow irregularly 1910-1912 and Mer ughin ('Our Way') published in Baku in 1912. By 1910-1911 the organization had been largely suppressed by the Russian government.

Following the 1917 February Revolution, the supported the Provisional Government of Russia. It opposed any reduction of the war effort. In the summer of 1917 the S.D.B.H.K. merged with the Russian Social Democratic Labour Party (Mensheviks) and the General Jewish Labour Bund to create a united Social Democratic organization in Baku. In the independent First Republic of Armenia (19181920), Davit Ananun and other Specifists founded the Social-Democratic Labour Party of Armenia as an opposition party. It was dissolved following the establishment of Soviet rule in Armenia.

Whilst the Specifists never gained a broad mass following, the Specifist tendency continued to be active in the Communist Party of Armenia well into the Soviet period. A number of former members of the S.D.B.H.K. held prominent positions in the government of the Armenian SSR, such as Alexander Miasnikian and Ashot Hovhannisian․

See also

 History of Armenia
 Politics of Armenia

References

1903 establishments in the Russian Empire
1917 disestablishments in Russia
Defunct socialist parties in Asia
Defunct socialist parties in Europe
Factions of the Russian Social Democratic Labour Party
Political parties disestablished in 1917
Political parties established in 1903
Political parties of minorities in Imperial Russia
Political parties of the Russian Revolution
Russian Social Democratic Labour Party